Hedy is a German given name, sometimes a diminutive form of Hedwig. Notable people with the name include:

 Hedy Bienenfeld (1907–1976), Austrian-American Olympic swimmer
 Hedy Burress (born c. 1973), American actress
 Hedy d'Ancona (born 1937), Dutch politician, geographer, and sociologist
 Hedy Epstein (born 1924), German-born Jewish-American political activist
 Hedy Frank-Autheried (1902–1979), Austrian composer
 Hedy Fry (born 1941), Trinidadian-Canadian politician and physician
 Hedy Graf (1926–1997), Spanish-born Swiss classically trained soprano
 Hedy Iracema-Brügelmann (1879–1941), German operatic soprano of Brazilian birth
 Hedy Klineman, American painter
 Hedy Lamarr (1914–2000), Austrian-American film actress and inventor
 Hedy Schlunegger (1923–2003), Swiss alpine skier
 Hedy Scott (born 1946), Belgian-American model and actress
 Hedy Stenuf (1922–2010), Austrian figure skater who later competed for France and the United States
 Hedy West (1938–2005), American folksinger and songwriter

Fictional characters include:

 Hedra "Hedy" Carlson/Ellen Besch, in the movie Single White Female            
 Hedy Newman, a character played by Jane Sibbett from the TV sitcom Herman's Head
 Hedy Wolfe, a Marvel Comics superhero, a friend of fellow superhero Patsy Walker
 Hedy (opera)

See also
 Heide (disambiguation)
 Heidi (disambiguation)

German feminine given names
Lists of people by nickname
Hypocorisms